Police bike may refer to:
Police motorcycle
Police bicycle